Jirikhimti is a market center in Myanglung Municipality in the Himalayas of Terhathum District in the Kosi Zone of eastern Nepal. Formerly a Village Development Committee, it was merged to form a new municipality on 18 May 2014.

Demographics 
At the time of the 1991 Nepal census it had a population of 2,682 people living in 509 individual households.

Geography and climate
The climate is generally cold.

Education 
Academic institutes include Evergreen English. Jirikhimti has one campus of agriculture.

References

External links
UN map of the municipalities of Terhathum District

Populated places in Tehrathum District